Calosoma peregrinator is a species of ground beetle in the subfamily of Carabinae. It was described by Félix Édouard Guérin-Méneville in 1844.

References

peregrinator
Beetles described in 1844